The East–West Interconnector is a 500MW high-voltage direct current submarine and subsoil power cable which connects the Irish and British electricity markets.  The project was developed by the Irish national grid operator EirGrid.

Aim
The interconnector is aimed to increase competition and security of supply, and better use the capacity of wind energy. The additional capacity headroom provided by the interconnection will assist in reducing the Electricity Supply Board's dominant position in the Irish electricity market. By joining the two markets it will allow Irish suppliers to access power in the British mainland market and for British suppliers to enter the Irish market without initially having to commit to large capital expenditure, significantly reducing barriers to entry. Irish renewable generators will benefit from the interconnection as it will increase their available market and may make it more economically attractive to construct more large scale renewable generation.

ESB Power Generation announced in 2007 its intention to withdraw approximately 1,300MW of capacity by 2010. This would effectively reduce the installed capacity of fully dispatchable plant from 6,437MW to 5,150MW. This closure of older inefficient power plants, such as a 461MW fossil fuel capacity at Poolbeg Generating Station Dublin, and coupled with the high growth demand forecasts presented, created a major threat to the security of the Irish electricity grid.

The interconnection will enhance security of supply and grid stability on both countries and create conditions suitable for the development of a new regional market.  The European Commission expressed the view that European electricity markets would benefit from further interconnection investments. The EU Trans-European Networks project has classified the UKIrish Interconnector as a priority project.

Location
At  in length,  of which is beneath the Irish Sea, the East West Interconnector links the electricity transmission grids of Ireland and Great Britain, from converter stations at Portan in Ireland to Shotton in Wales.

History
Studies for the UKIrish interconnection date back to the 1970s when the Irish Electricity Supply Board first examined the possibility of linking the UK and Irish electricity grids. Further studies were conducted in the early 1990s and a joint study was recently conducted between Electricity Supply Board and National Grid plc with the support of the European Union.

In 2004 the Commission for Energy Regulation on request of the Irish Government sought proposals from the private sector to construct two 500MW merchant interconnectors between Ireland and Wales. A private project was established by Imera Power who was contracted to develop two 350MW interconnectors through its affiliate East West Cable One Ltd. in 2006.

In 2006 the Minister for Communications, Energy and Natural Resources, instructed the Commission for Energy Regulation to commence the development of a regulated interconnector of 500MW as it was deemed to be critical infrastructure.

Eirgrid commenced work on the East West Interconnector in 2007. It was completed in 2012 and on 20 September 2012 it was inaugurated in Meath by UK secretary for energy and climate change Ed Davey, Irish prime minister Enda Kenny and European Commissioner for Energy Günther Oettinger.

On 8 September 2016, the interconnector had a fault that occurred during an annual maintenance at the converter station in Meath. The maintenance was carried out by contractor ABB. The interconnector re-entered service on 20 December 2016 with a fully rated 500MW import, however exports to the UK were still limited to roughly 280MW. , the cable offered full capacity in both directions. In March 2022, following a planned 3 week shutdown, the interconnector remained at below 1% capacity for an ongoing period.

Technical features
The link connects converter stations at Rush North Beach, County Dublin, Ireland, and Barkby Beach, Prestatyn, Wales. The interconnection uses ±200kV HVDC Light cables with a capacity of 500MW. It is the first HVDC Light transmission system project, to use ±200kV cables. The cables and converter stations were provided by ABB. The project was financed by a €300million loan from the European Investment Bank, capital investments from commercial banks, EirGrid equity and a €110million grant from the European Commission.

East West Cable One project - abandoned proposal
A competing project was undertaken by East West Cable One (EW1), also known as the East West Interconnector. The EW1 cable with a capacity of 350MW was to be connected at Arklow substation in County Wicklow and Pentir Substation near Bangor in North Wales.  The second cable known as EW2 was a second phase project with a capacity of 350500MW was proposed between Wexford and Pembroke.

Both developments were to be funded by the private sector on commercial basis; their costs would not be recovered by system tariffs for all end users in either UK or Ireland, but rather by the users of the cable, large wholesale energy traders.  Corresponding exemption from the third party access rule was granted by the European Commission on 23 November 2009 for 25years for phase one and 20years for phase two.

Since 2016, the associated websites for these projects have been mothballed.

Eirgrid Interconnector sites

See also
 Moyle Interconnector
 Western HVDC Link
 Greenlink

References

External links
 East–West Interconnector (EirGrid)
 Imera Power East–West Interconnector 
 Way of the cable
 http://www.abb.com/industries/ap/db0003db004333/a60fb5e59414e817c125774a002f365b.aspx
 Elexon/BMRS changes to accommodate flows in stats as INTEW

Electrical interconnectors to and from Great Britain
Electrical interconnectors to and from the island of Ireland
Electric power infrastructure in Wales
Electric power infrastructure in the Republic of Ireland
Ireland–United Kingdom relations
Energy infrastructure completed in 2012
2012 establishments in Ireland
2012 establishments in Wales